Dali Omar is a former Malaysian footballer. He played for the Armed Forces and Kelantan in the Malaysia Cup. In 1972, he moved to Australia and played for Perth Azzuri.

Honours

Club
ATM 
 Malaysia Cup 
Runners up: 1966

Kelantan
 Malaysia Cup 
Runners up: 1970

 Malaysia FAM Cup 
Runners up: 1971

International
Malaysia U-19
Asian Schools Football Championship: 1963
 AFC U-19 Championship: Third Place 1964

Individual
Asian Schools Football Championship Top Scorer: 1963
Malaysia Cup Top Scorer: 1966

References

1946 births
Living people
Kelantan FA players
Malaysian footballers
Perth Glory FC players
Association football forwards
Malaysian expatriate footballers